"Pensiero stupendo" (Italian for "Wonderful Thought") is a song written by Ivano Fossati (lyrics) and Oscar Prudente (music), and performed by Patty Pravo. A provocative description of a sexual ménage à trois, it was originally chosen to launch the French singer Jeanne Mas in the Italian market, but her version did not convince the RCA director Ennio Melis, who thought the song was more appropriate for Pravo. The track had been previously refused by Loredana Bertè.

The track was the first single from Patty's 1978 album Miss Italia. It turned out a major hit for her, peaking at no. 2 in May 1978, kept off the top spot for three consecutive weeks by the Bee Gees' "Stayin' Alive". It was the ninth best-selling single of the year and remains one of the biggest hits of Patty's career. The B-side of the 7" single was "Bello", a cover of Talking Heads' "Love → Building on Fire". The song's music video was a compilation of various TV performances.
 
"Pensiero stupendo" has been covered by several artists, including Dolcenera, Fausto Papetti,  La Crus and Róisín Murphy. In 1997, Pravo recorded a new version of the song to promote the album Bye Bye Patty, which peaked at no. 5.

Track listing
7" single (1978)
A. "Pensiero stupendo" (Ivano Fossati, Oscar Prudente) – 4:14
B. "Bello" (David Byrne, Maurizio Monti) – 3:31

CD maxi single (1997)
 "Pensiero stupendo '97" – 5:03
 "Pensiero stupendo" (V-Mix) – 4:21
 "Pensiero stupendo" (Vernetti + Gaudi Mix) – 3:53
 "Pensiero stupendo '97" (Live) – 5:48

Certifications

References

1978 singles
1978 songs
Italian songs
Patty Pravo songs
Songs written by Ivano Fossati